FK Banat Zrenjanin was a football club based in Zrenjanin, Vojvodina, Serbia.

History
The club was founded in June 2006 by the merger of Budućnost Banatski Dvor and Proleter Zrenjanin. They started competing in the Serbian SuperLiga in the competition's inaugural 2006–07 season, managing to avoid relegation. Moreover, the club's striker Srđan Baljak became the league's top scorer with 18 goals. They also reached the 2006–07 Serbian Cup semi-finals, being eliminated by Vojvodina. Later on, the club spent two more seasons in the top flight of the national league system, before finishing bottom of the table in 2009, thus suffering relegation to the Serbian First League. They also reached the 2008–09 Serbian Cup semi-finals, but were eliminated by eventual winners Partizan.

Between 2009 and 2013, the club competed in the second tier of Serbian football without notable results. They placed 15th out of 18 teams in the 2012–13 campaign and suffered relegated to the Serbian League Vojvodina. The club spent the next three years in the third tier, before finishing second from the bottom in the 2015–16 season, being relegated to the fourth tier. In August 2016, it was announced that they withdrew from the Vojvodina League East, eventually ceasing to exist.

Seasons

Notes

Notable players
This is a list of players who have played at full international level.

  Nenad Mišković
  Issouf Compaoré
  Filip Stojković
  Goran Vujović
  Borče Manevski
  Milan Stojanoski
  Ognjen Ožegović
  Zoran Tošić
  Dejan Rađenović
  Saša Zorić

For a list of all FK Banat Zrenjanin players with a Wikipedia article, see :Category:FK Banat Zrenjanin players.

Managerial history

References

External links
 Club page at Srbijasport

 
2006 establishments in Serbia
2016 disestablishments in Serbia
Association football clubs disestablished in 2016
Association football clubs established in 2006
Defunct football clubs in Serbia
Football clubs in Vojvodina
Sport in Zrenjanin